Three Chords and a Half Truth is the ninth studio album by American punk rock band Face to Face, released on April 9, 2013, through Trevor Keith's Antagonist Records, under exclusive license to Rise Records, their first album for Rise. This is the last Face to Face album to feature guitarist Chad Yaro.

The album's first single, "Right as Rain", was released on March 5, 2013. The single marked a change in style for Face to Face, a departure from their fast punk rock sound, into a more mid-tempo, layered classic punk sound. The album has been compared to those of Social Distortion, The Clash, and John Mellencamp.

Track listing
All songs written and composed by Trever Keith and Scott Shiflett, except "Right As Rain" written by Keith.
 "123 Drop" – 3:12
 "Welcome Back To Nothing" – 2:52
 "Smokestacks and Skyscrapers" – 3:08
 "Right As Rain" – 3:26
 "First Step, Misstep" – 3:45
 "Bright Lights Go Down" – 3:08
 "Paper Tigers with Teeth" – 3:46
 "Flat Black" – 3:00
 "Jinxproof" – 3:03
 "Marked Men" – 3:24
 "Three Chords and a Half Truth" – 2:24
 "Across State Lines" - 4:37
 "Hardcase" (Amazon MP3 bonus track) – 2:47

Personnel
 Trever Keith – vocals, guitar
 Chad Yaro – guitar, background vocals
 Scott Shiflett – bass, background vocals
 Danny Thompson – drums, background vocals

Additional musicians
 Dennis Hill – guitar, background vocals
 Jason Freese – Hammond B3, tenor saxophone
 Charles Keith – piano

References

2013 albums
Face to Face (punk band) albums
Rise Records albums